St. Augustine's School is an Anglo-Indian School in the hill station town of Kalimpong in West Bengal, India, established in 1945.

About
St. Augustine's is a minority Christian School established and administered by the Roman Catholic Diocese of Darjeeling. The school is under the religious jurisdiction of the Roman Catholic Bishop of Darjeeling, who is also the President of the Governing Body. The school conducts classes from Lower Kindergarten to Class XII and is affiliated to the Council for the Indian School Certificate Education in New Delhi. The school is recognized by the Department of Education of the Government of West Bengal.

Alumni 

 Adrian Pradhan, lead vocalist of Nepalese rock band 1974 AD
 Bipul Chettri, Nepali singer-songwriter

See also
Education in India
List of schools in India
Education in West Bengal

References

External links
 St. Augustine's School Kalimpong official site

Boys' schools in India
Schools in Colonial India
Catholic boarding schools in India
Christian schools in West Bengal
Private schools in West Bengal
Boarding schools in West Bengal
Schools in Darjeeling district
Kalimpong
Educational institutions established in 1945
1945 establishments in India